The star-chested treerunner or fulvous-dotted treerunner (Margarornis stellatus) is a species of bird in the family Furnariidae. It is found in Colombia and Ecuador.

Its natural habitat is subtropical or tropical moist montane forests. It is threatened by habitat loss.

References

star-chested treerunner
Birds of the Colombian Andes
Birds of the Ecuadorian Andes
star-chested treerunner
star-chested treerunner
star-chested treerunner
Taxonomy articles created by Polbot